Hiralal Mazumdar Memorial College for Women, established in 1959, is a women's college in Dakshineswar, Kolkata. It offers undergraduate courses in arts,commerce and sciences. It is affiliated to West Bengal State University.

Accreditation
Hiralal Mazumdar Memorial College for Women is recognized by the University Grants Commission (UGC). It was accredited by the National Assessment and Accreditation Council (NAAC) and awarded B++ grade in 2016.

See also
Education in India
List of colleges in West Bengal
Education in West Bengal

References

External links 
 

Educational institutions established in 1959
Colleges affiliated to West Bengal State University
Women's universities and colleges in West Bengal
1959 establishments in West Bengal